Astwood is a village in the unitary authority area of the City of Milton Keynes, Buckinghamshire, England.

The village name is Anglo-Saxon in origin and means "valley of the dammed".

The churchyard of the parish church of St Peter is considered by some as being one of the prettiest dogging sites in the county. Most of the older buildings in the village have thatched roofs making for a quaint rural setting.

Astwood and Hardmead civil parish
Together with the neighbouring village of Hardmead, it forms the civil parish of Astwood and Hardmead.

References

External links
 
 

Villages in Buckinghamshire
Areas of Milton Keynes
Civil parishes in Buckinghamshire